Mount Washington is a community on the east side of Cincinnati, Ohio, United States.  As one of Cincinnati's 52 neighborhoods, Mount Washington lies within the city corporation limits, and borders the neighborhoods of California and the East End, as well as unincorporated Anderson Township, Hamilton County, Ohio. 

The population was 20,540 at the 2020 census.

History
Mount Washington was laid out in 1846 and received its city rights in 1867. The community was annexed by the City of Cincinnati in 1911.
A major local landmark for Mount Washington is the Mount Washington Water Tower. It is a concrete water tower that went into service in November of 1940.  It stands near the corner of Beechmont Avenue and Campus Lane. It holds 3,000,000 gallons of water and, according to an article from 1940, stands 171 feet tall. However, The plaque outside the tower gives the dimensions as 151 ft. tall and 111 ft. in diameter. The tower was built in the Art Deco style typical of the era and other buildings in Greater Cincinnati like Cincinnati Union Terminal. It is owned and operated by the Greater Cincinnati Water Works (GCWW) which gives the height at 198 feet.

References

External links
Mount Washington Community Council

Neighborhoods in Cincinnati
Former municipalities in Ohio